Lightspeed is the debut album by the Dutch rock band Destine. It was released February 1, 2010, and January 29, 2010, on iTunes. Prior to the release of the album, seven of the twelve songs were released on the singles "Stars" and "In Your Arms".

Track listing

Bonus tracks

Personnel

Destine
Robin van Loenen - Lead vocals, rhythm guitar
Hubrecht Eversdijk - Lead guitar, backing vocals
Laurens Troost - Keyboards, synthesizers,  backing vocals
Tom Vorstius Kruijff - Bass guitar, backing vocals
Robin Faas - Drums

Artwork
Hubrecht Eversdijk - Album Design
Gage Young - Photography

Production
James Paul Wisner - Producer, mixing
Troy Glessner – Mastering at Spectre Studio, Renton, WA
Jason Adams – Assistant Engineer
Brooks Paschal – Assistant Engineer

Charts
Album

Singles

Release history

2010 albums
Destine albums
Sony Music albums
Albums produced by James Paul Wisner